You People is a 2023 American romantic comedy film directed by Kenya Barris, which he co-wrote with Jonah Hill. The film features an ensemble cast that includes Hill, Lauren London, David Duchovny, Nia Long, Julia Louis-Dreyfus, and Eddie Murphy. Its plot focuses on an interracial and interreligious couple, namely a white Jewish man and a Black Muslim woman, and how their families reckon with modern love amid culture clashes, societal expectations and generational differences. Set in the Los Angeles area, two Millennials meet by chance and go into uncharted waters in their dating lives.

You People was released in select theaters on January 20, 2023, before its Netflix streaming release on January 27. It was the first time Barris directed a feature film. The film received mixed-to-negative reviews from critics and has stirred questions of anti-semitism.

Plot

Ezra Cohen, a thirty-five-year-old broker and podcaster, falls into an unlikely relationship with fashion designer Amira Mohammed. The couple first meet each other when Amira, frustrated with her GPS navigation system, parks in front of the building where Ezra works. Ezra, mistakenly believing Amira is his Uber driver, climbs into the car, setting off an awkward dust-up. Ezra makes amends for his mishap by later taking her out to lunch, and the two realize there is a mutual attraction despite their differences, as Ezra is Jewish, and Amira is Black and was raised by her parents who are devout followers of the Nation of Islam.

Amira and Ezra eventually move in together, to the chagrin of her father Akbar who prefers that his daughter date another Nation of Islam member. Six months into his relationship with Amira, Ezra takes her to meet his family. His parents Shelley and Arnold awkwardly explain that they are accepting and supportive of everyone, including their LGBT daughter Liza. When Shelley begins to bring up subjects related to the BLM movement, an embarrassed Ezra steers her out of the room. He confides to his mom that he plans on proposing to Amira. Before he can propose, Ezra is urged by his friend and fellow podcast host Mo to meet with Amira's parents. Ezra chooses a Roscoe’s Chicken ‘N Waffles restaurant to talk with Akbar and his wife, Fatima. The meeting does not go smoothly, as Akbar views Ezra with suspicion and shows resistance to his wish to marry Amira. When Amira comes home, she tells Ezra that her mother let her know about their awkward meeting at Roscoe’s. However, when Ezra begins to pull out a ring box, she urges him to go ahead with the proposal and happily accepts.

Ezra decides to quit his job at the brokerage firm to pursue his true passion for podcasting. Later, the couple invite both sets of parents over to their place for dinner and to discuss wedding plans. The dinner unsurprisingly goes awry, with the parents clashing over Farrahkhan's antisemitic views and Shelley inadvertently setting Akbar’s kufi on fire. Ezra and Amira arrange mutual one-on-one time with their future in-laws to help smooth over tensions. Ezra spends the day with Akbar, but Akbar constantly finds ways to undermine Ezra’s self-confidence, from criticizing Ezra's decision to quit finance for podcasting and bringing him to a barbershop where Ezra fails to conform with the dress code. He later takes Ezra to a basketball court in Inglewood, a mostly Black neighborhood, and urges him to play in a pickup game. Hoping to humiliate Ezra, Akbar films him with his phone, but to his surprise, Ezra does very well in the game. Meanwhile, Shelley takes Amira out for a spa day, but she continually shows her cluelessness, makes Amira uncomfortable, and is oblivious to her own microaggressions.

For his bachelor party, Ezra heads to Las Vegas with his friends, but his excitement for the weekend is dampened when Akbar unexpectedly joins the boys. Akbar insists on accompanying the men on their big night of partying at the strip clubs. Ezra, knowing he’s being watched by Akbar, does not take part in the festivities, but his character again comes into question when his friends loudly reminisce about the obscene acts Ezra previously committed in Vegas. At her bachelorette party in Palm Springs, Amira and her friends are joined by Shelley and Liza. The night suffers from more embarrassments, with Shelley inadvertently making a racist remark during a party game and accidentally ripping off a guest’s wig.

At the rehearsal dinner, both Ezra and Amira speak privately to Akbar and Shelley, with Ezra calling out Akbar’s distrust of his genuine love for Amira, and Amira informing Shelley about her tone-deaf attitudes on race. After their mutual talks, Ezra and Amira arrive at the realization that their union has too many obstacles to overcome. Feeling they are not right for each other, they call off the wedding and break up. Three months later, Ezra gives a meaningful soliloquy on his podcast, making a point that black and white people can never truly understand the other's experience, no matter how hard they try. Both Shelley and Akbar happen to hear his speech, and reconsider their actions; Akbar is inspired to contact Shelley. On the pretext of a shopping excursion, Shelley and Akbar bring Ezra and Amira to a trendy boutique where they both apologize for their actions. Ezra and Amira accept their apologies and enter the retail store to find it set up for their wedding, with everyone including friends, family, and a rabbi and NOI minister assembled. Ezra and Amira marry and both families celebrate.

Cast

Production 
In June 2021, it was reported that Jonah Hill would star in a Netflix comedy film directed by Kenya Barris from a script written by Hill and Barris. In August 2021, it was announced that Eddie Murphy would star in the film. In September 2021, Julia Louis-Dreyfus, Lauren London, Sam Jay, and Molly Gordon joined the cast. In October 2021, more cast members joined the film, including David Duchovny, Nia Long, Travis Bennett, Andrea Savage, Rhea Perlman, La La Anthony, and Deon Cole. In November 2021, Emily Arlook, Bryan Greenberg, Andrew Schulz, and Jordan Firstman joined the cast.

Filming began in October 2021 in Los Angeles.

Release
You People was released in select theaters on January 20, 2023. It was released on January 27, 2023, by Netflix. In its first week, the film debuted at number one on the Netflix English-language Top 10 list, being streamed for 55.65 million hours.

Reception  
 On Metacritic, the film has a weighted average score of 50 out of 100, based on 33 critics, indicating "mixed or average reviews".

Pete Hammond of Deadline called it "brilliantly hilarious, pertinent and wickedly smart." Christian Zilko of Indiewire graded the film a B+ and concluded that it "ends up being more of a feel-good rom-com and love letter to Los Angeles than a truly biting satire." Richard Roeper of the Chicago Sun-Times wrote that it "sinks under the weight of its obviousness and a consistently heavy-handed approach, despite the sometimes stylish and well-paced direction from Kenya Barris and an incredibly talented cast."  Meanwhile Allisson Josephs of Jew in the City identified a number of traditional antisemitic tropes recycled by the film, going so far as to claim that "Kenya Barris is clearly a [Louis] Farrakhan fan." Mira Fox of The Forward also criticised the film for ignoring the concept of Jews as an ethnic minority in their own right, as well as openly furthering the antisemitic conspiracy theory that "Jews are so wealthy now...from controlling the slave trade. This is a conspiracy theory that's growing in strength, yet the movie does nothing to debunk it".

Notes

References

External links 
 
 

2023 films
2023 romantic comedy films
American romantic comedy films
2023 directorial debut films
2020s American films
2020s English-language films
2023 LGBT-related films
African-American films
English-language Netflix original films
Films about interracial romance
Films produced by Jonah Hill
Films set in 2021
Films set in 2022
Films shot in Los Angeles
Films with screenplays by Jonah Hill
Films with screenplays by Kenya Barris